was a district located in Niigata Prefecture, Japan.

Towns and villages 
Prior to its dissolution, the village consisted of only one village:

 Kawaguchi

History 

 On 1954 - The areas now covering Ojiya were merged and elevated to city status.

Recent mergers 
 On November 1, 2004 - The towns of Horinouchi and Koide, and the villages of Hirokami, Irihirose, Sumon and Yunotani were merged to form the city of Uonuma.
 On March 31, 2010 - The town of Kawaguchi was merged into the expanded city of Nagaoka. Kitauonuma District was dissolved as the result of this merger.

See also 
 List of dissolved districts of Japan

Former districts of Niigata Prefecture